The 2005–06 Liga de Fútbol Profesional Boliviano was the first Bolivian football league to use the European calendar format. However, it was quickly changed after issues with relegation occurring in the middle of the season instead of the end.

Torneo Apertura
The first part of the season was divided into two groups. The top three of each group advanced to a final group stage known as the Hexagonal Final.

Serie A

Serie B

Hexagonal final

Promotion/relegation
Due to issues with the second division and changing to the European season format, a relegation was held in the middle of the season between the Apertura and Clausura. Universidad Iberoamericana was relegated and Destroyers played a promotion relegation playoff against Guabirá. Universitario was promoted to the Torneo Clausura.

Torneo Clausura

Topscorers

References
RSSSF 2005 Apertura
RSSSF 2006 Clausura

2005–06
Bolivia
1
Bolivia
1